Stretching  is a form of physical exercise in which a specific skeletal muscle is deliberately elongated to its fullest length.

Stretching may also refer to:

 Canvas stretching, the lengthening of a canvas by pulling
 Scaling (geometry) in one direction
 Stretching (body piercing), the deliberate expansion of a healed fistula for the purpose of wearing body piercing jewelry
 Stretching the truth
 Vortex stretching, the lengthening of vortices in three-dimensional fluid flow

See also

 Stretch (disambiguation)
 Stretcher (disambiguation)